Nils Miatke (born 30 January 1990) is a German footballer who plays as a midfielder for ZFC Meuselwitz.

Club career

Energie Cottbus
Miatke was born in Drachhausen. He came up through the youth academy at Energie Cottbus, entering the club's system at the age of 10 and graduating to the senior team at the age of 19. He made his competitive debut for the senior team on 1 August 2009 in a 3–1 away victory over Magdeburg in the DFB-Pokal. He made his league debut for the club just eight days later in a 3–1 home victory over Augsburg. He was subbed off for Mariusz Kukiełka in the 87th minute.

Carl Zeiss Jena
In July 2011, Miatke moved to 3. Liga club Carl Zeiss Jena. He made his competitive debut for the club on 23 July 2011 in a 3–0 away defeat to Rot-Weiß Erfurt. He scored his first competitive goal for the club on 14 September 2011 in a 2–1 away victory over Rot-Weiß Oberhausen. His goal, scored in the 35th minute, made the score 2–0 to Jena.

Erzgebirge Aue
In July 2012, Miatke signed with 2. Bundesliga club Erzgebirge Aue. On 7 September 2012, Miatke suffered a ruptured cruciate ligament in training. The injury caused him to miss the entire 2012/13 season. He made his competitive debut for the club on 27 July 2013 in a 1–0 home victory over Sandhausen. On 6 March 2015, in the 26th minute of a league match against Ingolstadt, Miatke was subbed off injured. The injury turned out to be a cruciate ligament and meniscus tear in his right knee. He would miss the remainder of that season and almost all of the following one.

Zwickau
In June 2016, Miatke moved to newly-promoted 3. Liga club FSV Zwickau. He made his competitive debut for the club on 10 August 2016 in a 3–1 away victory over Werder Bremen II. He was subbed off in the 81st minute, being replaced by Christoph Göbel. He scored his first competitive goal for the club on 26 January 2018 in a 2–0 home victory over Sonnenhof Großaspach. His goal, assisted by Bentley Baxter Bahn, was scored in the 22nd minute. On 20 October 2018, Miatke tore the inner band in his knee during training. He was sidelined for six to eight weeks.

References

External links 
 
 

1990 births
Living people
People from Spree-Neiße
People from Bezirk Cottbus
German footballers
Footballers from Brandenburg
Association football midfielders
2. Bundesliga players
3. Liga players
Regionalliga players
FC Energie Cottbus players
FC Energie Cottbus II players
FC Carl Zeiss Jena players
FC Erzgebirge Aue players
FSV Zwickau players
ZFC Meuselwitz players